Matey Popov (born 30 April 1951) is a Bulgarian water polo player. He competed at the 1972 Summer Olympics and the 1980 Summer Olympics.

References

1951 births
Living people
Bulgarian male water polo players
Olympic water polo players of Bulgaria
Water polo players at the 1972 Summer Olympics
Water polo players at the 1980 Summer Olympics
Sportspeople from Sofia